Babice is a village in Chrzanów County, Lesser Poland Voivodeship, in southern Poland. It is the seat of the gmina (administrative district) called Gmina Babice.

The village was founded on April 2, 1866 and has a population of 1,369.

References

Villages in Chrzanów County